Thicket is an unincorporated community in northwestern Hardin County, Texas, United States. It is part of the Beaumont–Port Arthur Metropolitan Statistical Area.

The West Hardin County Consolidated Independent School District serves area students.

References

Unincorporated communities in Hardin County, Texas
Unincorporated communities in Texas
Beaumont–Port Arthur metropolitan area